This article is of the Countesses of Dreux; the consorts of the French counts of Dreux.

Countess of Dreux

House of Dreux

House of Thouars

House of Albret

House of Valois-Orléans

House of Albret

House of Valois
None

House of Bourbon-Soissons

House of Savoy-Carignan-Soissons

House of Orléans-Longueville 
None

House of Bourbon-Vendôme

House of Bourbon-Condé 
None

House of Palatinate-Simmern 
None

House of Bourbon-Condé 
None

House of Bourbon-Maine 
None

House of Bourbon-Penthièvre

House of Orléans
Sole surviving heiress of her father and of the properties of the house of Bourbon du Maine, Louise Marie Adélaïde de Bourbon (died 1821) added the château and domain of Dreux to the possessions of the house of Orléans by her marriage with Philippe Égalité.  She was the mother of the future king Louis Philippe.  The domain is now property of the Fondation Saint-Louis.

Notes

Sources

 
House of Dreux
Lists of French nobility
Dreux